Argentina will compete at the 2019 World Athletics Championships in Doha, Qatar, from 27 September to 6 October 2019. Argentina will be represented by 3 athletes.

Results

Men

Field events

Women
Track and road events

References

External links
Doha｜WCH 19｜World Athletics

Nations at the 2019 World Athletics Championships
World Championships in Athletics
Argentina at the World Championships in Athletics